Siah Khan (also Romanized as Sīāh Khān; also known as Jānābād-e ‘Alīja‘far and Sīāh Khān-e Pīrī) is a village in Dust Mohammad Rural District, in the Central District of Hirmand County, Sistan and Baluchestan Province, Iran. At the 2006 census, its population was 58, in 12 families.

References 

Populated places in Hirmand County